The 2012 Texas Tech Red Raiders baseball team represented Texas Tech University during the 2012 NCAA Division I baseball season. The Red Raiders played their home games at Dan Law Field at Rip Griffin Park as a member of the Big 12 Conference. The team was led by Dan Spencer in his fourth and final season as the team's head coach.

The team finished with an overall record of 29–26, but went 7–17 in conference play, winning only one series in Big 12 play. Spencer was fired following the season, finishing his tenure at Texas Tech with an overall record of 115–112 and a Big 12 record of 44–61. Associate head coach Tim Tadlock would be promoted to head coach.

Previous season
The 2011 team finished with an overall record of 33–25. The team went 12–15 in Big 12 play, finishing in 7th place. The Red Raiders were invited to the Big 12 Tournament. Texas Tech lost game one 5–10 to Texas A&M and were eliminated by Oklahoma, 1–3, in game two.

Personnel

Coaching staff

Roster

Schedule and results

"*" indicates a non-conference game.
"No." represents ranking. All rankings from Collegiate Baseball on the date of the contest.

Rankings

References

External links
2012 Baseball Schedule
2012 Baseball Roster

Texas Tech Red Raiders
Texas Tech Red Raiders baseball seasons
Texas Tech Baseball